Trine Gjesti Bentzen (born 3 July 1973) is a Norwegian sport wrestler.

She won a bronze medal at the 1990 World Wrestling Championships in Luleå. She placed fourth in the 50 kg class at the 1993 World Wrestling Championships in Stavern.

References

1973 births
Living people
Norwegian female sport wrestlers
World Wrestling Championships medalists
20th-century Norwegian women
21st-century Norwegian women